Thai Tiger Airways was planned as a joint venture of Singaporean low-fare airline Tiger Airways and Thailand's Thai Airways International and was founded in 2010. However, the plan was scrapped on 19 September 2011 by Thai Airways International.

History
The board of directors of Thai Airways International Plc had agreed to co-invest with Tiger Airways Holdings Limited to set up a new low-cost airline, as said by the executive director of the Legal Department at Thai Niruth Maneepan.

The low-cost airlines, Thai Tiger Airways, was to have an initial capital of 200 million baht. Thai would invest 99.6 million baht, or 49.8 per cent in the new joint venture. Thai's affiliate firms would take 1.2 per cent stake, and Tiger Airlines Holdings would hold the remaining 49 per cent.

The co-investment memorandum of understanding was signed on Monday, 2 August 2010, by Thai president Piyasvasti Amranand and Tiger Airlines Holdings CEO Tony Davis.

It would serve regularly scheduled domestic and international flights from Bangkok's Suvarnabhumi Airport in Thailand.
Thai Tiger Airways would be the second low-cost airline operating both domestic and international flights from the Suvarnabhumi Airport. Plans were made to commence operations in the first quarter of 2011, pending regulatory approvals.  Thai Tiger would operate international and domestic flights offering short-haul, point-to-point services within a 5-hour flying radius. Thai Tiger had originally planned to commence operations in May 2011, though by July 2011 the Thai government had not yet approved the airline.

Fleet

Thai Tiger Airways would have used Bangkok Suvarnabhumi Airport as its gateway to fly to other nations in Southeast Asia.

References

Proposed airlines of Thailand
Defunct airlines of Thailand
Airlines established in 2010
Airlines disestablished in 2011
Defunct low-cost airlines
Thai companies established in 2010
2011 disestablishments in Thailand